Lists of Australians covers selected notable Australian people organised by awards and honours, occupation, ethnicity, sports and other qualities.

Australians of the Year
List of Australian of the Year Award recipients
List of Senior Australian of the Year Award recipients
List of Young Australian of the Year Award recipients
List of Australian Local Hero Award recipients

Awards and honours
List of Australian Victoria Cross recipients
List of Knights and Dames of the Order of Australia
List of Companions of the Order of Australia
Recipients of Australian civil awards and decorations

Education
List of Australian university leaders
List of University of Adelaide people
List of Australian National University people
List of La Trobe University people
List of Macquarie University people
List of Queensland University of Technology people
List of University of Melbourne people
List of Monash University people
List of University of New England people
List of University of New South Wales people
List of University of Queensland people
List of University of Sydney people
List of University of Western Australia people
List of famous Old Sydneians

Entertainment and culture
List of Australian film directors
List of Australian poets
List of Australian novelists
List of Australian architects
List of Indigenous Australian musicians
List of Indigenous Australian visual artists
List of Indigenous Australian writers
List of Australian television presenters
List of Australian Idol semi finalists
List of Australian composers
List of Australian hip hop musicians
List of Australian women artists
List of Australian women photographers

Geography and ethnicity
List of Chinese Australians
List of Sri Lankan Australians
List of Hungarian Australians
List of Turkish Australians
List of Italian Australians
Lists of Indigenous Australians
List of Pakistani Australians
List of people from Adelaide
List of Noongar people
List of people from Melbourne
List of Queenslanders
List of people from Wollongong
List of VFL/AFL players by ethnicity
List of Oceanian Jews

Law and crime
List of Australian criminals
List of Australian politicians convicted of crimes
List of Australians in international prisons
List of Australian Federal Police killed in the line of duty
List of Judges of the Supreme Court of the Australian Capital Territory
List of Justices of the High Court of Australia
Lists of people legally executed in Australia:
List of people legally executed in New South Wales
List of people legally executed on Norfolk Island
List of people legally executed in the Northern Territory
List of people legally executed in Queensland
List of people legally executed in South Australia
List of people legally executed in Tasmania
List of people legally executed in Victoria 
List of people legally executed in Western Australia

Literature
List of Indigenous Australian writers
List of Australian novelists
List of Australian poets
List of Australian women writers

Politics
Father of the Australian Senate
Father of the Australian House of Representatives
Father of the Australian Parliament
List of Australian ministers
List of Australian Opposition Leaders
List of Australian Greens parliamentarians
List of Indigenous Australians in politics and public service
List of Australian Ambassadors to Iran
List of Australian Ambassadors to the United Nations
List of Australian Ambassadors to the United States
List of the first women appointed to Australian judicial positions
List of High Commissioners and Ambassadors from Australia
List of prime ministers of Australia
Members of the Parliament of Australia who have served for at least 30 years
People who have served in both Houses of the Australian Parliament

Mayors and Lord Mayors
List of Mayors and Lord Mayors of Adelaide
List of Mayors and Lord Mayors of Brisbane
List of Mayors and Lord Mayors of Hobart
List of Mayors and Lord Mayors of Melbourne
List of Mayors and Lord Mayors of Perth
List of Mayors and Lord Mayors of Sydney

Premiers
Premier of New South Wales
Premier of South Australia
Premier of Queensland
Premier of Tasmania
Premier of Western Australia
Premier of Victoria

Religion
List of Anglican bishops of Sydney
Catholic Bishops and Archbishops of Perth, Western Australia
Catholic Bishops and Archbishops of Sydney

Sport
List of Australian Test cricketers'''
Australian national cricket captains
List of Australian Test wicket-keepers
List of Australian Test batsmen who have scored over 5000 Test runs
List of Australian ODI cricketers
List of Australian Twenty20 International cricketers
Australian Test cricket umpires
List of Australian rules football and cricket players
List of Australian Football League umpires
Australian Rugby League's Team of the Century
List of Australian Football League coaches
List of Australian Winter Olympians
List of VFL/AFL players by ethnicity
List of players from Australia in Major League Baseball

Miscellaneous
Australian Living Treasures
List of people on stamps of Australia
List of Indigenous Australians associated with European colonisation of Australia
List of Australian businesspersons

See also

Australian people
Lists of Australian people
Lists of people by city in Australia
Lists of Australian military personnel
Australia-related lists